Acianthera duartei is a species of orchid.

References

duartei